Brno University of Technology (abbreviated: BUT; in Czech: Vysoké učení technické v Brně – Czech abbreviation: VUT) is a university located in Brno, Czech Republic. Being founded in 1899 and initially offering a single course in civil engineering, it grew to become a major technical Czech university with over 18,000 students enrolled at 8 faculties and 2 university institutes.

History
The Jesuits dominated university education in Moravia at the beginning of the 18th century as they controlled the University of Olomouc. The focus on theology and philosophy was not welcomed by the Moravian nobility. The nobility initiated the commencement of law education at the University of Olomouc in 1679. Later in 1725, the Moravian nobility enforced the establishment of the Academy of Nobility in Olomouc. Law and economy, mathematics, geometry, civil and military architecture, history, and geography were lectured there. As it aimed to promote knighthood also foreign languages, dance, swordsmanship, and equitation were taught there. The Academy was in Olomouc until 1847 when it was relocated to Brno, where it became the basis for what was later to become the University of Technology.

Due to the extinction of the University in Olomouc, no institution would provide an academic education in Moravia, and only one technical school, besides the German one, could not cover the lack of need, so the students mostly left to Prague, Vienna, or Kraków. Related to this situation the voices that called for the establishment of a university, but not a regional one in Olomouc but in the state capital – Brno, grew stronger. The Moravian Germans rejected the second Czech university and thus led to many quarrels (the settlement occurred after the collapse of the Austro-Hungarian Empire in 1919 by the establishment of Masaryk University). In September 1899 the disputes were solved by founding the Imperial Czech Technical University of Franz Joseph in Brno.

In the beginning, the university was settled in Augustine Street and had to make do with 4 professors and 47 students who could study only Civil Engineering. In the following year (1900) the teaching of the field of machine engineering was started and followed by cultural engineering (landscaping), electrical engineering, and chemical engineering. After World War I it was also possible to study architecture. In 1911 the university  was moved into a newly built luxurious building in Veveří Street which is still used by the Faculty of Civil Engineering. In the interwar period, it was connected with the German Technical University and was renamed the Brno University of Technology. The school has used the name of the University of Technology of Dr. E. Benes for a short time.

After the German occupation of Czechoslovakia and installing the Protectorate of Bohemia and Moravia, all Czech universities, including the Czech Technical University, were forced to close (see International Students' Day). After the end of the war in 1945, the university was restored to its pre-war state, also taking over buildings of the German Technical University in Brno which was closed.  After the war, the school was reopened under the older name the University of Technology of Dr. E. Benes. The school was ceased to exist in 1951; some parts were transferred to the newly established Military Technical Academy. The only faculties that provided civilian training remained the Faculty of Civil Engineering and Architecture Faculty, both under the name College of Engineering. Already in 1956, the university activity was gradually restored under the present name Brno University of Technology. Today's appearance was more or less stabilized in 1961.

After 1989 there was a reorganization of certain faculties and the emergence of many new ones. There was restored The Faculty of Chemistry  (1992) and in addition to the technical fields, BUT focused on the economy (Faculty of Business founded in 1992) and arts (Faculty of Fine Arts, founded in 1993).

Another milestone is associated with the year 2000 when the BUT separates two faculties deployed in Zlín - Faculty of Technology and Faculty of Management and Economics - and thus established the Tomas Bata University. 

The most recent significant organizational change is the splitting of the Faculty of Electrical Engineering and Faculty of Electrical Engineering and Computer Science at the Faculty of Electrical Engineering and Communication and the Faculty of Information Technology which occurred in 2002.

Most of the BUT buildings are now located in the area under Palacky Hill in the city district Kralovo Pole. There are the Faculty of Mechanical Engineering, Faculty of Business, Faculty of Chemistry, and a new building of the Faculty of Electrical Engineering and Communication as well as two college campuses. 

Faculty of Information Technology is located in a former Carthusian monastery in Bozetechova Street and the new complex across the street. The Faculty of Civil Engineering is located in an extensively reconstructed building on Veveri Street. Faculty of Architecture is located on Porici Street, Faculty of Fine Arts on Udolni Street. BUT also uses the third college campus in Kounicova Street. Rector's Offices are located in a newly renovated Baroque building in Antoninska Street.

In more than 120 years BUT has matured into an internationally recognized institution offering education in a broad spectrum of fields ranging from technical and scientific disciplines through economics to the arts.

Authorities
The head of the university is the rector who is represented by five prorectors in various fields of activity. Financial matters of BUT are in the hands of the bursar, communication and promotion is the business of the public relations officer in cooperation with the Unit of external relations. Important documents and guidelines are discussed and approved by the Academic Senate which consisted of an employee and a student chamber. The scientific direction of BUT determines the Scientific Council, acting as BUT experts, other universities, and industry.

Each of the faculty is governed by the dean and his vice-deans. Also, the faculties have their academic senates which deal exclusively with the laws of the faculties. Similarly, the faculties have their scientific council. There are several student organizations in BUT, for historical reasons called the Student Unions. Each Faculty has its student chamber which represents students in the Academic Senate - students have the opportunity to participate in the management of their faculty.

 Rectorate — prof. RNDr. Ing. Petr Štěpánek, CSc., dr. h. c. 
 The Academic Senate — current chairman of the senate is doc. Dr. Ing. Petr Hanáček.
 Bursar — doc. Ing. Ladislav Janíček, Ph.D., MBA, LL.M. is the university bursar.

Faculties

 Faculty of Civil Engineering
 Faculty of Mechanical Engineering
 Faculty of Chemistry
 Faculty of Architecture
 Faculty of Business and Management
 Faculty of Electrical Engineering and Communication
 Faculty of Fine Arts
 Faculty of Information Technology

Faculty of Architecture (FA) 

One of the oldest faculties of Brno University of Technology was established in 1919. During its existence the faculty was merged with the Faculty of civil Engineering. Currently provides training in architecture and urban design and has about three hundred students.

Faculty of Chemistry (FC) 

Teaching Chemistry at BUT dates back to 1911 when there was established Department of Chemistry at the Czech Technical University. The development was interrupted in 1951 by converting BUT to the Military Technical Academy. The restoration of the teaching of chemistry was reached in 1992. Faculty realizes bachelor's, master's and doctoral degree programs in chemistry and food industry.

Faculty of Electrical Engineering and Communication (FEEC) 

Studying at the faculty is focused on a wide range of scientific areas: control technology and robotics, biomedical engineering, power electronics and electrical engineering, electrotechnology and electronics, microelectronics, radioelectronics and teleinformatics.

Faculty of Information Technology (FIT) 

Already in 1964 the department of automatic computers was established in the Faculty of Electrical Engineering, lately the institute of informatics detached which was transformed in 2002 into an independent faculty of information technology.
FIT campus is located in a former Carthusian monastery and the former estate.

The faculty consists of four institutes:
 Department of Computer Systems
 Department of Information Systems
 Department of Intelligent Systems
 Department of Computer Graphics and Multimedia

The faculty offers two basic levels of study - a three-year bachelor and two-year master's degree program. The third level is the doctoral degree program.

Faculty of Business and Management (FBM) 

One of the youngest BUT faculty focuses on the economy and business fields of study. In 1992 the faculty was separated from the original Faculty of Mechanical Engineering. 
Besides bachelor's, master's and doctoral programs in this field the faculty offers in cooperation with foreign universities postgraduate MBA studies. About 3 000 students study management, accounting, corporate finance, taxation and managerial science.

Faculty of Civil Engineering (FCE) 

FCE is the oldest faculty of Brno University of Technology and the biggest one with its number of students – 6 500. In 1899 the university started its activities with this branch and that faculty was the only one which survived a violent change - transformation BUT into the Military Technical Academy in 1951.

Students can study in four programmes in Czech at this faculty:
 Civil Engineering
 Urban Engineering
 Surveying and Cartography
 Architecture

and one programme in English:
 Civil Engineering

Faculty of Mechanical Engineering (FME) 

The opening of the engineering department was in 1900 and herewith it is the second oldest faculty of the BUT. In the past there was taught energy branch from which subsequently became an independent Faculty of Electrical Engineering.

The faculty offers study of:
 Engineering
 Applied Sciences in Engineering
 Mechanical Engineering
 Production Systems
 Industrial Design
 Industrial Engineering
 Machines and Equipment
 Applied Natural Sciences
 Physical and Materials Engineering
 Metrology and Quality Assurance Testing

Faculty of Fine Arts (FFA) 

On the contrary, one of the youngest BUT faculties is the Faculty of Fine Arts. In 1993 it was founded from the institute of fine arts which was based in the faculty of architecture a year earlier. As the number of students (3 thousands) it is the smallest faculty of current BUT.
Some of the study programs are: 
 painting
 sculpture
 graphics
 graphic design
 industrial design
 conceptual tendencies
 VMP (multimedia, video-performance).

University institutes

Institute of Forensic Engineering (IFE) 

The aim of the institute is teaching forensic experts in master's degree programs - Venture engineering and Forensic engineering (expert engineering in transportation and real estate). It is possible to study The Forensic engineering program as a doctoral study. In preparation is the transformation of the institute to the separate department faculty with the temporary name the Faculty of Forensic Engineering.

Centre for Sports Activities (CESA) 

In cooperation with the Faculty of Business CESA provides courses of study in Management of Physical Culture. Students can choose from more than 70 sports like basketball, swimming, athletics, golf or diving.

CEITEC Brno University of Technology (CEITEC BUT) 

CEITEC is a centre for progressive innovative education which encourages scientific creativity in its research groups and a fostering of the principles of engagement. The institute offers a unique inter-institutional graduate programme, which in general is based on the CEITEC research programmes. Currently, one doctoral programme is available – Advanced Materials and Nanosciences.

Studies

The school is a holder of the European Commission ECTS certificates (European Credit Transfer System) - Label and DS (Diploma Supplement) Label for the period 2009-2013, reflecting the appreciation of quality of the university education in keeping with the principles of the Bologna Declaration. ECTS Label supports studying abroad at universities around the world. DS Label Certificate was awarded for the correct free award of the Diploma Supplement to all graduates of the principles of the European Commission.

Brno University of Technology offers its students:
 295 study programs (of which 89 are accredited in foreign languages)
 Participation in major international and scientific projects
 Study at foreign and partner universities
 More than 70 sports in 5 own specialized sports centers
 Accommodation in halls of residences for the majority of applicants
 9 libraries

Study programs:
 Civil, Mechanical, Electrical and Forensic engineering
 Information Technology
 Chemistry
 Economics and Management
 Fine arts
 Architecture

Cooperation with foreign institutions:
 Framework agreements with 90 universities around the world
 International educational research and development programs

Participation in EU programs for education:
 CEEPUS
 LLP / Erasmus
 TEMPUS
 Joint and double degree programs

Lifelong learning:
 Is provided by faculties in their courses
 MBA education (Master of Business Administration)

Lifelong Learning Institute:
 provides counseling, information and organizational services
 offers training and consultancy
 organizes courses and seminars for seniors at the University of the Third Age

Science and Research 

Research activities at the Brno University of Technology are realized in cooperation with national and international projects, programs, grants and research centers. BUT intensively cooperates with other universities and institutions, with the Academy of Sciences of the Czech Republic and private companies. The efforts of integration of teaching and scientific research are supported by application sector with which new curricula is prepared. Students can obtain a range of practical experience during their studies, thereby facilitating the selection of employment and competitiveness of BUT graduates. One of the BUT goals is to become a research university.

Main research areas 
 Environmental Technology
 IT and communication technology
 Aeronautical Engineering
 Materials Engineering
 Microelectronics and Nanotechnology
 Studies for building and construction machinery
 Advanced polymer and ceramic materials
 Process and Chemical Engineering
 Robotics and Artificial Intelligence
 Sensing images and computer processing
 Manufacturing technology

Research Centers 
 
 AdMaS - advanced building materials, engineering and technology
 CEITEC - a center of excellence in biological sciences, materials and emerging technologies in cooperation of the Brno University of Technology and Masaryk University, Brno Mendel University, University of Veterinary and Pharmaceutical Sciences, Brno, Institute of Physics of Materials, Academy of Sciences and Veterinary Research Institute.
 Centre for information, communication and biomedical technologies
 Material Research Center in chemistry
 Centre for Research and utilization of renewable energy
 NETME Center - New Manufacturing Technology

Cooperation with industry 

BUT cooperation with industry includes among others:

 innovation and the preparation of new degree programs in collaboration with industry
 direct cooperation in research and development companies in Czech Republic and abroad
 personal participation of experts on education process
 professional visits and internships
 contact point for cooperation between enterprises and the BUT is Technology Transfer Office

Notable teachers

 Bohuslav Fuchs, Major Czech modernist architect

Notable alumni
 Mirek Topolánek, 7th Prime Minister of Czech Republic

 Luděk Navara, Czech non-fictional author, publicist, scenarist and historian
 Norbert Troller (1900-1984), artist and architect.
 Radim Jančura, founder and CEO of Student Agency
 Tomas Mikolov, Machine learning scientist

Notes and references

External links
 Official website
 History of the German Technical University in Brno
 Article about a restoration of a former monastery in quarter Královo Pole, turned into a Centre of Application Technology
 Central European Institute of Technology, CEITEC
 MARABU, experimental aircraft

 
Universities in the Czech Republic
University
University
Educational institutions established in 1899
Buildings and structures in Brno
Engineering universities and colleges in the Czech Republic
1899 establishments in Austria-Hungary